Namdalens Folkeblad (The Namdalen People's Gazette) was a Norwegian newspaper published in Namsos from 1899 to 1942 and from 1945 to 1963. 

The newspaper was a continuation of the periodical Gjallarhorn. The newspaper presented itself from 1899 to 1926 as "a temperance, news, and advertising paper; an entertainment paper for the home." The newspaper was taken over by Nordtrønderen og Namdalen in 1964.

Editors of the paper included Ludvig Larssen, Reidar Stavseth, and Haakon Storøy.

References

Defunct newspapers published in Norway
Norwegian-language newspapers
Mass media in Trøndelag
Namsos
Newspapers established in 1889
Publications disestablished in 1963